The Medal of Belgian Gratitude is a Belgian medal instituted to be awarded to civilians on 1 August 1945.

Insignia 
The medal measures 34 mm in diameter and has an octagonal shape.
The obverse depicts a veiled woman (representing Belgium) facing to the right, with a rapier in her right hand, raised in salute.
The medal came in 3 versions: gold, silver and bronze.

The reverse bears the inscription “PATRIA GRATA 1940 1945” with a decorative pattern on either side of the inscription.
The medal is attached to the ribbon via a laurel wreath. The laurel wreath is open in the center. However, the wreath is filled with a red cross when it is awarded for meritorious service during the administration of aid to the sick or the wounded.

The ribbon is purple, with 3 central stripes of black, yellow and red, the colors of the Belgian national flag.

Award Conditions
The medal of Belgian gratitude was awarded for devotion to philanthropy in order to relieve people from the depravations of the war.

Notable recipients (partial list)
 The gold medal was awarded to the Dutch town of Vught as a token of gratitude towards its citizens for their acts of compassion towards the Belgian political prisoners held in nearby Herzogenbusch concentration camp.

See also

 List of Orders, Decorations and Medals of the Kingdom of Belgium
 Belgian order of precedence (decorations and medals)

References 

 Decree of the Prince Regent of 1 August 1945 creating a medal of Belgian gratitude
 Quinot H., 1950, Recueil illustré des décorations belges et congolaises, 4e Edition. (Hasselt)
 Cornet R., 1982, Recueil des dispositions légales et réglementaires régissant les ordres nationaux belges. 2e Ed. N.pl.,  (Brussels)
 Borné A.C., 1985, Distinctions honorifiques de la Belgique, 1830-1985 (Brussels)

External links
 The Medal of Belgian Gratitude 1940-1945
 The Medal of Belgian Gratitude 1940-1945
 

1945 establishments in Belgium
Military awards and decorations of Belgium
Military of Belgium
Awards established in 1945